SEPTA's Subway-Surface Trolley Route 36 (a.k.a.; the Elmwood Avenue-Subway Line) is a trolley line operated by the Southeastern Pennsylvania Transportation Authority (SEPTA) that connects the 13th Street station in downtown Philadelphia, Pennsylvania, to the Eastwick Loop station in Eastwick section of Southwest Philadelphia, although limited service is available to the Elmwood Carhouse. It is the longest of the five lines that are part of the Subway-Surface Trolley system, and was even longer between 1956 and 1962 when the western terminus was at 94th Street and Eastwick Avenue. Since 1975, it only goes as far as what was once 80th Street at the southern edge of the Penrose Plaza shopping center parking lot.

Route description
Starting from its eastern end at the 13th Street, Route 36 runs in a tunnel under Market Street. It stops at underground stations at 15th Street, 19th Street, 22nd Street, 30th Street, and 33rd Street.  From 15th to 30th Streets, it runs on the outer tracks in the same tunnel as SEPTA's Market–Frankford Line.

Passengers may transfer free of charge to the Market–Frankford Line at 13th, 15th, and 30th Streets and to the Broad Street Line at 15th Street.  Connections to the SEPTA Regional Rail are also available.  Underground passageways connect the 13th and 15th Street Stations to Jefferson Station and Suburban Station.

Route 36 surfaces at the 40th Street Portal near 40th Street and Baltimore Avenue (US 13), and then runs southwest along Woodland Avenue along with the Route 11 trolleys, and then turns down 49th Street where the Woodland Maintenance Facility is located and the Route 10 diversion line ends. After 49th Street crosses over the Wilmington/Newark Line, it takes a sharp right curve as the road becomes Grays Avenue. Route 36 runs along Grays south of the Wilmington/Newark Line until it makes a diagonal move southwest onto Lindbergh Boulevard. Shortly after leaving Grays the line intersects with 54th Street and crosses over a bridge for the Philadelphia Subdivision freight line, and immediately intersects with a road running along the line leading to Bartram's Botanical Garden, the oldest surviving botanical garden in North America.

Just before Lindbergh Boulevard becomes a divided highway east of 56th Street, the line moves onto Elmwood Avenue. From there it crosses over the Airport Line, continuing westward until it enters an industrial area and makes a left turn at a five way intersection that includes Elmwood Avenue, Island Road and Passyunk Avenue on the southeast corner. The northeast corner is the location of the Elmwood Depot on Island Road. Tracks runs northward along Island Road as far north as Woodland Avenue, which handles pull-ins/pull-outs for Routes 11 & 13.

Island Road is a wide boulevard with the Route 36 tracks down the middle, until the road divides at Buist Avenue, where the tracks run down the median, and a trolley stop exists.  Another stop exists at Tanager Street. South of Tanager Street, the southbound Island Avenue lane crosses over the tracks, and they now run between the main road and southbound frontage road. The next stop is South 76th Street, which intersects with the frontage road, but has a stop along both this and the main road. The Route 36 line crosses Lindbergh Boulevard again, where it has its own stop in the median on both sides of the tracks north of Lindbergh Boulevard. The southwest corner also includes the Penrose Plaza Shopping Center, which spans the west side of Island Road as far down as the terminus of the Route 36 line, the Eastwick Loop, which is accessible from a U-Turn beneath the Island Road bridge over the SEPTA Airport Line, and is four blocks east of Eastwick Railroad Station. SEPTA plans to expand the regional rail station and possibly merge it with the trolley station, transforming it into the Eastwick Transportation Center.

History
Route 36 was established as the Elmwood Avenue Line in 1904 by the Philadelphia Rapid Transit Company. Original streetcar service operated between Island Road and Elmwood Avenue via Center City on Market Street to Front & Market Streets. Service rerouted into the Subway-Surface Tunnel and extended to the Westinghouse Plant in Essington on November 5, 1955 replacing Route 37 trolley service. OWL (24-hour) service transferred from Route 37 to Route 36 at the same time. At the western terminus, service was cut back to 94th Street & Eastwick Avenue on September 9, 1956. Service was cut back again to 88th Street on August 15, 1962, Service was cut back a third time to 84th Street on January 5, 1966, but extended back to 88th Street on December 11, 1972. Service was cut back to 80th Street & Eastwick Avenue on April 26, 1975. In 1985, Island Avenue was converted into a new bridge over the SEPTA Airport Line near the station, and the intersection of 80th Street and Eastwick Avenue was replaced by a frontage road loop on the north side of the tracks. Despite the elimination of the 80th Street intersection, trolleys still sign their destination as 80th Street – Eastwick.

In 2021, SEPTA proposed rebranding their rail transit service as "SEPTA Metro", in order to make the system easier to navigate. Under this proposal, the subway–surface lines will be rebranded as the "T" lines with a green color and numeric suffixes for each service, and Route 36 would be renamed "T5 Elmwood Avenue." SEPTA described that "most comments were positive" in the public comment period for this rebranding project.

Stations and stops
All are in the City of Philadelphia.

References

External links

Official SEPTA Route 36 schedule and map

36
Railway lines opened in 1904
Tram routes in Philadelphia
1904 establishments in Pennsylvania